John Panton (died 1619), of Henllan, Denbighshire and Westminster, Middlesex, was a Welsh politician.

He was a Member (MP) of the Parliament of England for Denbigh Boroughs in 1597 and 1601 and for Harwich in 1604.

References

16th-century births
1619 deaths
16th-century Welsh politicians
17th-century Welsh politicians
People from Westminster
Members of the Parliament of England for Harwich
Members of the Parliament of England for Denbigh Boroughs
English MPs 1597–1598
English MPs 1601
English MPs 1604–1611